Roger Pilote (March 4, 1934—6 January 2023) is a Canadian former politician in the province of Quebec.

Pilote was born in Saint-Nazaire, Quebec in 1934, and attended primary schooling there. He later attended Université de Sherbrooke and then served as a professor at l'École de commerce de Chicoutimi and l'Université du Québec à Chicoutimi. Pilote was a Liberal member of the National Assembly of Quebec for Lac-Saint-Jean from 1970 until his defeat in the 1976 election.

References

Living people
1934 births
Université de Sherbrooke alumni
Academic staff of the Université du Québec
Quebec Liberal Party MNAs
People from Saguenay–Lac-Saint-Jean